Ollie Olds (born 14 August 1993) is a Welsh professional rugby league footballer  who plays as a  or  for the Swinton Lions in the RFL Championship and Wales at international level.

Background
Olds was born in Bridgend, Wales.

Club career
A former Wales under-16's international, Olds joined the Leeds Rhinos on trial in 2011, and later joined the club on a permanent basis, becoming the regular scrum-half in their under-20's team. During his time at Leeds Rhinos, Olds played two games for York City Knights on dual registration. Olds then joined the South Wales Scorpions in 2013, before heading to Australia to play for Ipswich Jets.

Following multiple knee and ankle operations, Olds initially retired from the sport in 2020, but was persuaded to come out of retirement by his brother.

International honours
Having represented Wales at junior level, Olds made his début for Wales in a mid-season international against France in 2012. He became one of a select number of players to make his international début before his senior début at club level.
Olds played in the 2014 and 2015 European Cup tournaments. Olds scored his first international tries in Wales' first game of the 2017 Rugby League World Cup qualifiers, scoring a double against Serbia. Olds scored a try for Wales in their opening match of the 2021 Rugby League World Cup against the Cook Islands. Wales would narrowly lose the match 18-12.

References

External links
Wales profile
Welsh profile
Search for "Ollie Olds" at bbc.co.uk

1993 births
Living people
Fortitude Valley Diehards players
Ipswich Jets players
Leeds Rhinos players
Rugby league halfbacks
Rugby league players from Bridgend
South Wales Scorpions players
Souths Logan Magpies players
Swinton Lions players
Wales national rugby league team players
Welsh rugby league players
York City Knights players